Falchi is an Italian surname. Notable people with the surname include:

 Anna Falchi (born 1972), Italian-Finnish model and film actress
 Carlos Falchi (born 1944), Brazilian-born handbag and accessories designer
 Isidoro Falchi (1838-1920), Italian doctor and archaeologist

References

Italian-language surnames